Patrik Nechvátal (born July 8, 1992 in Brno) is a Czech professional ice hockey goaltender for JKH GKS Jastrzębie of the Polska Hokej Liga.

Nechvátal previously played for HC Litvínov, Orli Znojmo, HC Innsbruck, and Nice hockey Côte d'Azur.

Career statistics

Regular season and playoffs

References

External links

 

1992 births
Living people
Les Aigles de Nice players
HC Baník Sokolov players
Czech ice hockey goaltenders
HC TWK Innsbruck players
JKH GKS Jastrzębie players
HC Litvínov players
HC Most players
HC Nové Zámky players
Orli Znojmo players
HK Poprad players
Ice hockey people from Brno
Czech expatriate ice hockey players in Slovakia
Czech expatriate sportspeople in Austria
Czech expatriate sportspeople in France
Czech expatriate sportspeople in Poland
Expatriate ice hockey players in France
Expatriate ice hockey players in Poland
Expatriate ice hockey players in Austria